Etna is a city in the Scott Valley area of Siskiyou County, California, United States. Its population is 678 as of the 2020 census, down from 737 from the 2010 census.

Name
Originally named Rough and Ready, it was changed by statute in 1874 to Etna after the local flour mill (spelled Ætna/Aetna after Mount Ætna in Sicily).

Geography
Etna is located at  (41.457350, -122.896875). Etna is in Northern California near the Oregon border, located in Scott Valley near the CDP of Greenview, the city of Fort Jones, and the unincorporated community of Callahan. Etna is located at the foot of the Marble Mountain Wilderness in the Siskiyou subrange of the Klamath (Cascades) Range and is an attraction for hikers, rafters, climbers and people who do all sorts of other outdoor activities.

Demographics

2010
At the 2010 census Etna had a population of 737. The racial makeup of Etna was 627 (85.1%) White, 0 (0.0%) African American, 28 (3.8%) Native American, 1 (0.1%) Asian, 1 (0.1%) Pacific Islander, 6 (0.8%) from other races, and 74 (10.0%) from two or more races. Hispanic or Latino of any race were 26 people (3.5%).

The census reported that 731 people (99.2% of the population) lived in households, 6 (0.8%) lived in non-institutionalized group quarters, and no one was institutionalized.

There were 323 households, 93 (28.8%) had children under the age of 18 living in them, 141 (43.7%) were opposite-sex married couples living together, 36 (11.1%) had a female householder with no husband present, 24 (7.4%) had a male householder with no wife present.  There were 19 (5.9%) unmarried opposite-sex partnerships, and 3 (0.9%) same-sex married couples or partnerships. 105 households (32.5%) were one person and 47 (14.6%) had someone living alone who was 65 or older. The average household size was 2.26.  There were 201 families (62.2% of households); the average family size was 2.86.

The age distribution was 173 people (23.5%) under the age of 18, 35 people (4.7%) aged 18 to 24, 125 people (17.0%) aged 25 to 44, 251 people (34.1%) aged 45 to 64, and 153 people (20.8%) who were 65 or older.  The median age was 48.5 years. For every 100 females, there were 101.9 males.  For every 100 females age 18 and over, there were 97.2 males.

There were 359 housing units at an average density of 473.3 per square mile, of the occupied units 206 (63.8%) were owner-occupied and 117 (36.2%) were rented. The homeowner vacancy rate was 4.5%; the rental vacancy rate was 4.8%.  441 people (59.8% of the population) lived in owner-occupied housing units and 290 people (39.3%) lived in rental housing units.

2000
At the 2000 census there were 781 people in 329 households, including 210 families, in the city. The racial makeup of the city was 88.48% White, 0.13% African American, 6.02% Native American, 0.64% Asian, 1.02% from other races, and 3.71% from two or more races. Hispanic or Latino of any race were 3.46%.

Of the 329 households 28.0% had children under the age of 18 living with them, 48.9% were married couples living together, 11.6% had a female householder with no husband present, and 35.9% were non-families. 31.0% of households were one person and 17.6% were one person aged 65 or older.  The average household size was 2.37 and the average family size was 2.98.

The age distribution was 26.1% under the age of 18, 4.7% from 18 to 24, 21.4% from 25 to 44, 25.1% from 45 to 64, and 22.7% 65 or older.  The median age was 44 years. For every 100 females, there were 95.3 males.  For every 100 females age 18 and over, there were 93.6 males.

The median income for a household in the city was $25,179, and the median family income  was $30,461. Males had a median income of $25,972 versus $20,750 for females. The per capita income for the city was $13,737.  About 13.7% of families and 19.7% of the population were below the poverty line, including 23.5% of those under age 18 and 9.1% of those age 65 or over.

Government

Religious sites
St. Gregory Palamas Monastery, a Greek Orthodox Christian monastery, is located in Etna, California. The Center for Traditionalist Orthodox Studies (established 1981) and the Metropolitan Cyprian Theological Library are located on the monastery grounds.

Notable residents
Etna is the birthplace of Caitlin Olson, who is considered to be the "Engine of the Internet Archive".

References

External links

Etna at City-Data.com

1878 establishments in California
Cities in Siskiyou County, California
Incorporated cities and towns in California
Populated places established in 1878